Nariyuki (written: 斉敬 or 成幸) is a masculine Japanese given name. Notable people with the name include:

 (born 1983), Japanese cyclist
 (1816–1878), Japanese kugyō

Japanese masculine given names